Zaza Revishvili (born 23 September 1968) is a former Georgian professional football player. He was the captain of FC Dinamo Tbilisi (1991–1992).

Honours
 European Champion U17: 1985
 Umaglesi Liga  champion: 1990, 1994, 1995.
 Russian Premier League champion: 1995.
 Russian Premier League runner-up: 1996.

European club competitions
   
 1987–88 UEFA Cup with FC Dinamo Tbilisi: 6 games.
 1992–93 UEFA Cup with GKS Katowice: 2 games.
 1994–95 UEFA Cup with FC Dinamo Tbilisi: 2 games.
 1996–97 UEFA Champions League qualification with FC Alania Vladikavkaz: 2 games.
 1996–97 UEFA Cup with FC Alania Vladikavkaz: 1 game.

External links
 
 

1968 births
Footballers from Tbilisi
Living people
Soviet footballers
Footballers from Georgia (country)
Soviet Union under-21 international footballers
Georgia (country) international footballers
FC Dinamo Tbilisi players
GKS Katowice players
FC Spartak Vladikavkaz players
R.W.D. Molenbeek players
Expatriate footballers from Georgia (country)
Expatriate footballers in Poland
Expatriate footballers in Russia
Russian Premier League players
Expatriate footballers in Belgium
Expatriate sportspeople from Georgia (country) in Poland
Association football midfielders